Garett Hickling (born September 18, 1970) is a Canadian wheelchair rugby player. He is on the Canada national wheelchair rugby team and has been voted most valuable player at several World Championships (1995-1998-2002). He has a Gold medal from the 2002 World Championships in Gothenburg, Sweden, a silver medal from the 2004 Paralympic Games in Athens, and a bronze medal from 2008 in Beijing. He was the Canadian flag-bearer at the opening ceremony for the London 2012 Paralympics. He has competed in every Paralympics that included his sport, representing Canada five times.

Hickling broke his neck at age 16 in 1987. He and two friends were hiking an unfamiliar B.C. trail at night when they fell off a cliff; one of the friends died. About five years later, Hickling took up wheelchair rugby.

References

Murderball legend Hickling keeps pushing, The Province, September 22, 2010

External links
 
Push 2010WWRC Commercial at the 2010WWRC's YouTube channel

1970 births
Living people
Canadian wheelchair rugby players
People with tetraplegia
Paralympic wheelchair rugby players of Canada
Wheelchair rugby players at the 2000 Summer Paralympics
Wheelchair rugby players at the 2004 Summer Paralympics
Wheelchair rugby players at the 2008 Summer Paralympics
Wheelchair rugby players at the 2012 Summer Paralympics
Paralympic bronze medalists for Canada
Paralympic silver medalists for Canada
Medalists at the 1996 Summer Paralympics
Medalists at the 2004 Summer Paralympics
Medalists at the 2008 Summer Paralympics
Medalists at the 2012 Summer Paralympics
Paralympic medalists in wheelchair rugby